Shlah may refer to:
 Shlach, Torah portion
 Shelah HaKadosh, Rabbi Isaiah Horowitz